The 2003 NHK Trophy was the final event of six in the 2003–04 ISU Grand Prix of Figure Skating. It was held at the Asahikawa Taisetsu Ice Arena in Asahikawa on November 27–30. Medals were awarded in the disciplines of men's singles, ladies' singles, pair skating, and ice dancing. Skaters earned points toward qualifying for the 2003–04 Grand Prix Final. The compulsory dance was the Yankee Polka.

Results

Men

Ladies

Pairs

Ice dancing

External links

 2003 NHK Trophy
 Official site 

Nhk Trophy, 2003
NHK Trophy